The characters within the Warrior Nun Areala comic series are well developed.  Through the serial nature of publication of these fictitious adventures several heroes have been developed. The chief among them is the Warrior Nun Areala, Sister Shannon Masters. Behind her are her fellow Christian soldiers, who like her have devoted their lives to the service of God and His Church. They are her friends and through trial and tribulation have become the family she otherwise would not have.

That is seen in Sister Shannon's foster sister joining the Warrior Nuns and her looking at her fellow Sisters as just that, sisters. Initially uncertain of herself she has developed as a character and has grown ever stronger due to her unbreakable faith and love for God and His Son Jesus Christ. She has formed strong bonds of affection with her surrogate sisters, Sasuki, Mary, and Sarah; her surrogate son, Jason; her parent figures, Father Gomez and Mother Superion; her love interest, Father Crowe. Alongside them, she has fought a wide variety of foes such as Demon Foster, Julius Salvius, and Helga.

God
 

God, in this fictitious series, is the Supreme Being, the Almighty Creator of Heaven and Earth, the Omnipotent, Omniscient, Omnipresent, the All-Perfect and All-Loving Father and Ruler of all Creation. Despite appearing only very rarely, He is the linchpin of the entire Warrior Nun Areala universe with His earthly representatives and servants protecting His children from the depredations of evil.

God—also called the Lord, the Almighty or Yahweh/Jehovah—created space-time along with all reality an indefinite time ago and created out of love for those who would be His children. Ruling from Heaven on high and "working in mysterious ways," He guides Creation to the ultimate good of His "children." Indeed, His Christian worshippers refer to Him as Father. However, not all wish to accept His love and even reject Him and His goodness altogether. In the beginning, one of His creations, Lucifer rejected God's wisdom and, thinking that he could be a superior leader than his omniscient Creator, sought to take the throne of Heaven. Lucifer's War of Heaven and rebellion against God and His goodness led to the creation of evil. To deliver His children whom He so loved from evil, He, as God the Father or Yahweh, sent Himself in the form God the Son or Jesus, and even sacrificed His own life so that whoever believes in Him should not die but have eternal life. Afterwards, God made His will known through the One, Holy, Catholic, and Apostolic Church that His Son established on Saint Peter.

Over the millennia, God the Son's (that is to say Jesus) [Catholic] Church has proven an overall boon to civilization. Funding, engaging in, and promoting art, schools, science, literature, music, social justice, humanitarian aid, charity, hospitals, serving as a mediator between warring parties, keeping western civilization alive after the fall of the Roman Empire, the Catholic Church has done its best to serve God/Jesus, and quite admirably at that. However, being only human and thus more out of innate weakness rather than intentional malignancy, these churchmen more often than not fall miserably short of the ideals they strive to uphold. Out of their love for God, they nevertheless still try and do as well as mere mortals can.

However, that is not to say that, despite the Catholic Church being the "official" church, non-Catholic or even non-Christian churches are scorned. Warrior Nun Areala portrays God as acknowledging all as His children. Despite the fact the Jews mostly reject Christ as the Messiah, Jewish super-heroes are seen evidencing that the old covenant is still in force. There was once seen an Indian medicine man calling on the Great Spirit to battle monsters in a story set in the 1870s. (Being that not only His Earthly worshippers—Christian, Muslim, Jew—who number in the billions know of Him, but that He also has His worshippers from other planets in the universe  and worshippers from all the parallel universes in the multiverse  know of him, His children are infinite in number.)

To protect all His children, was why God ultimately—though indirectly—created the Catholic Corps. The Corps is a branch of His Church and exists to combat evil in whatever form it may take, though it is usually supernatural evil directed by Satan in an attempt to destroy the Church. While there had been earlier Judeo-Christian heroes fighting men and monsters in the name of God, the Corps as an institution ultimately began in 1066. That was when a Valkyrie named Auria saw her fellow pagan deities for who they were, renounced them, and chose to serve the Lord. He accepted her conversion and gave her the name, Areala. This shows two things.

Despite His importance and the fact that He is constantly mentioned and the series main character lovingly refers to Him as Father, He almost never makes an appearance. In that He, in His infinity, is beyond all possible human comprehension, anyone who so much as sees Him will surely die. As such, He in the handful of appearances mostly appears as a disembodied voice, though even that is still overwhelming now as in ancient times. He does not "micromanage" Creation, allowing humanity full use of the freewill He gave it. He does not do for humanity what it can do for itself—albeit with help from Him. Thus He rarely intervenes directly and instead mostly delegates authority, giving a person a mission and the power necessary to complete that mission. At one point Ben Dunn said that just as the President of the United States will delegate authority, so does God.

A second thing this shows is that the lesser "gods" have mixed reactions towards Him. He tells his people  "I am the Lord thy God. Thou shalt have no other gods before me"  and repeatedly admonishes them not to worship other gods—be they dead idols, demons in disguise, or supernatural beings. His prophets ask "Who among the gods is like you, O LORD ? /Who is like you—/ majestic in holiness, /awesome in glory,/working wonders?"  The fact is that God is absolute and the lesser "gods" just cannot compare. Some deities such as Odin and Tyr, though they did not like it, resigned themselves to their fates and accepted that even after they were dead and forgotten by the mortal world, that there would still be a God greater than themselves "One so great that He cannot be named." Others, such as Valkyrie Helga, violently resist Him even to the point of siding with Satan and the forces of evil.

Sister Shannon Masters
Of all the Warrior Nuns, the most famous of them is their founder, the original Sister Areala who renamed herself after the angel Areala who chose her as her avatar. Since then, every few decades, a new Sister Areala comes along when a sister of the order has a vision of the original Sister Areala or the angel Areala during a near-death experience. Afterwards, the angelic Areala will periodically meet with her avatar, giving her needed advice or information. The current Warrior Nun Areala, is Sister Shannon Masters.

An American, she was born in 1959 and was orphaned at the age of four where on she was left at the steps of a convent, the Our Lady of the Virgin Mary. After showing exceptional academic and athletic abilities, she was chosen for the Silver Cross Program and was raised to be a Warrior Nun at upper New York State's Saint Thomas Academy. Growing up at the Saint Thomas Academy, she wrestled with feelings of self-worth over how she had been orphaned. However, she overcame those doubts and found a purpose for her life in her service to the Church as did her adopted sister, Sasuki Yoma of Japan. While Sister Shannon's birth parents are unknown, she was adopted early on into the Yoma family; thus her experience at the academy was more of a boarding school. It was while she trained there under a young Mother Superion that she first met and befriended the future Sister Sarah, her best friend; Father David Crowe, her future love interest; and Shotgun Mary. After being trained at the academy by Mother Superion, she received final training from her at Vatican City.

Though a rookie, Sister Shannon's training was completed and she was sent home to New York City where she patrolled two sectors from her assigned Manhattan parish on the grounds that she was assigned to an area where there had not been demonic activity since the Purge of 1985. Replacing Sisters Sanguine and Hannah, she soon saw a sustained surge in New York City's demonic activity after her arrival. (A stock situation in comic books wherein the supervillains can appear only after a hero shows up.) She soon received her calling from the first Sister Areala after she was nearly killed in a battle with minions of Satanist and arms dealer Julius Salvius. On recognizing her as the Chosen One of that generation, the original Sister Areala gave Sister Shannon her name and awakened her latent power. It was made official when the Areala confirmed her as her avatar after a battle against the avatar of mad valkyrie Helga.

Now, Sister Shannon Masters patrols the region and in addition to being the Warrior Nun Areala, she is acknowledged as one of the best and bravest of the order. The other sisters look up to her and she tries to be an effective role model. However, while she is very devoted she initially lacked much combat experience and shows it with the cybernetic arm that replaces her original left arm she lost while combatting Salvius' attempts to free Lucifer. When out of combat, Sister Shannon trains, instructs future Warrior Nuns, and (before he left) looked after her ward/"son" Jason, or pray.

Melina Matthews portrays Shannon in the Netflix series adaptation.

Characters

Father Terrance Gomez
Father Terrance Gomez is the middle aged Pastor of Saint Thomas Church (later said to be St. Ilumine) in Manhattan where Sister Shannon is stationed Her mentor, friend, and confidante, he trains her and presumably others in the Danger Room-like training facility beneath the church. To that end, he will also use his training skills in assessing children for the Silver Cross. Though rarely an active combatant, he is in touch with the Catholic Corps' Defense Units due to his experience in the Corps itself before he had to drop out. He is also quite able to take care of himself when monsters attack or try to infiltrate his parish; the church is equipped with a small armory and demon detection devices. (However, the devices can only detect demons; non-demonic supernatural creatures are not detected.) Skilled with gadgets, he often repairs Sister Shannon's cybernetic arm or upgrades it.

He is also a lifetime comic book collector of mostly Antarctic Press Comics. He goes to comic book conventions even at his age; he allegedly gets autographs for parishioners. In his youth he was a Catholic US Army Chaplain in the 863rd Corps in the Vietnam War and befriended the Antarctic Press superhero Tomorrow Man—and collected Tomorrow Man's comic books. He was also instrumental in rebuilding the Vietnam veteran's broken self-confidence and giving him back his powers after losing them in the war.

He is one of the few characters in the series who, despite his occasional superheroics, "does his job" as a priest and says mass. He has been seen saying mass and distributing the Eucharist to the faithful. As a secular or diocesan priest, he works in a church and from comments about "the parishioners" it can be seen that he works in religious instruction, Catholic ritual, and charity for the betterment of his Manhattan neighborhood. He has served there since perhaps 1985.

He has since died.

Father David Crowe
Father David Crowe is a member of the Order of Magic Priests, the church's elite band of demon hunting spell casters. Initially trained at New York's St. Thomas Academy like Sister Shannon, the two of them have had feelings for one another since childhood. However, due to the vows they both swore as part of their duty they have never consummated their relationship. Even so, Sister Shannon is quite open in admitting her feelings—she calls him David—and even though Father Crowe tries to downplay his love, he is quite protective of her. Also, while he will not disobey orders from the Vatican, he has been known to "reinterpret" them from time to time in order to render assistance to Shannon. He will often work with Sister Shannon and often wears his trademark sunglasses.

He was raised by devout Catholic parents until they were murdered. Though the storyline was cancelled before it could be completed, the script for the unreleased third issue, (available at barrylyga.com) states that they were killed by Magic Priest Father Doloroso for having uncovered his criminal acts. Doloroso, consumed by guilt and unwilling to confront himself, used his powers to erase his memories of the event as well as those of young Crowe. Doloroso, now unaware that he killed Crowe's parents, took pity on the boy and raised him out of the goodness of his heart. Though Doloroso's memories have returned and he has gone mad both from guilt and from having repeatedly erased his bad memories. Crowe has forgiven his mentor and occasionally visits him in his padded madhouse cell. After being raised by Doloroso, young Crowe was trained by the legendary Father Goth at the Saint Thomas Academy and later at the Saint Dymphna Academy in Rome. As a man Father David Crowe is one of the more powerful and influential Magic Priests. He showed promise even as a boy at the head of his class when he flew on his first try and took young Shannon flying over the academy. Now, as a man, he can fly from Rome to New York City, though that tires him. He has stood up to foes such as the Hammer, a Jewish mystic of the Kabbalah with decades more experience, and hordes of demons. He often works with the hulking Father Stone or more rarely Father Fang.

In other, less martial areas, he will write articles for and appear in the fictional magazines, Jesuit Monthly and Modern Catholic. Unlike Father Gomez, Father Crowe is a religious priest, a member of the fictional Order of Magic Priests, and is thus not tied down to any one parish but goes where needed. When Jason was shown to be a potential Magic Priest, Father David took the boy under his wing. Yet while he is one of the best Magic Priests, or perhaps because of it, he is a reactionary in who can be ordained and taught to use their powers. Though men and women trained by the Silver Cross to serve in the Catholic Corps are equally gifted with miraculous powers, only men receive full training. Despite seeing young miracle-working Catholic girls, he has taken a conservative stance, saying that they should not be trained in priestly powers. He is consistently portrayed as very stern and quiet.

In his first appearance in Ninja High School, Father Crowe was simply called Magic Priest. There he saved a young witchling named Mimi Masters and her mother, Shanna, from an abusive stepfather, a mechanic named Stanley who was in fact a demon. Shanna referred to Crowe as her daughter's biological father. It is not certain is this is cannon relative to Areala. Later, in a series not written by Ben Dunn he was called Father Sebastian Crowe. Sebastian may be a middle name.

Jason
Jason was Sister Shannon Masters' foster son. He was brought to Saint Thomas Church by Shotgun Mary who found being prepared for use as a human sacrifice by devil worshippers. An amnesiac, Jason has no memory of his life before this. He was taken to St. Thomas Church where Father Terrance Gomez took the boy in. Afterwards, with the two of them living in the Church rectory, Sister Shannon raised the boy as her own. There, he would help in the rectory as Father Gomez' assistant often reading the man's comics books. He would occasionally serve as his surrogate mother's child sidekick. He enjoys action figures and roleplays Sister Shannon's adventures with them. He has a friend in Roberts, a trenchcoat wearing man who occasionally passes by St. Thomas Church.

However, Sister Shannon admitted to herself that it was not a very normal childhood she was giving Jason, not with his being raised by a sword swinging Warrior Nun. Aside from that, she would teach him right from wrong, buy him ice cream, blushingly teach him about the "birds and the bees", or take him to comic book conventions. It was at one comic book convention that he was revealed to be touched by God with superhuman powers. With that, a very enthusiastic Jason was taken in by Father David Crowe to be trained as a Magic Priest. He trained with the other Silver Cross children under Sister Madeline and has since grown strong. Yet when Sister Shannon saw the boy she had taken and raised leave her, she could not help but cry.

As for Jason himself, he is shown as being happy in Silver Cross under the tutelage of Sister Madeline.

Shotgun Mary
Mary Delacroix or "Shotgun Mary" is the series' anti-heroine answer to the wholesome Sister Shannon. An "orphan of Christ" like her fellows, Mary Delacroix was initially raised by the nun Sister Justine or "Ju-Ju" as she called her as a child. She was a mother to the child and did her best to inculcate her charge with love for God and reverence for life. Perhaps a Warrior Nun herself, Sister Justine was a skilled gunwoman, particularly with a shotgun, a skill that she has passed on to her surrogate daughter. Soon enough, she left her surrogate mother and went to train at the same orphanage/academy as Sisters Sarah and Shannon Masters and Father David Crowe. She is said to have enjoyed playing softball on convent grounds.

Rebellious even as a girl who smuggled cigarettes onto orphanage grounds, 'Shotgun' Mary was a Warrior Nun before she left the order. She left for two reasons: to protest the preferential treatment of the Magic Priests who, aside from being better funded, receive full training in the supernatural powers that both they and the Warrior Nuns have. She feels that if her fellow Warrior Nuns sisters had been fully and properly trained in their powers, that many of them would still be alive; Secondly, because she is a lesbian and attracted to a fellow Warrior Nun. 'Shotgun' Mary is a vigilante who fights human criminals as freely as she does monsters, though she has been known to work within the law. Gruff and hard-edged - she wears sunglasses and leather jackets, swears, smokes, rides a motorcycle, and has—according to some artists--tattoos, among them the words "Ju-Ju" to honor her surrogate mother. She specialized in Satanic cults.

She inherits her surrogate mother's taste for shotguns, hence her name. Using firearms to get her point across, she mostly uses Pump-action weapons. When fighting monsters, it is known she  uses silver bullets and the like, but common ammunition seems to be enough. At other times, she uses blessed ammunition such as a mix of Holy Ash and Incense to avoid the risk of killing civilians. She is also skilled in hand-to-hand combat due to her training as a Warrior Nun, though having left, she has forfeited the supernatural powers they possess. She currently serves with the Redeemers, a group of vigilante demon hunters who operate outside any organization, including the auspices of the Vatican. The members include; herself, Tomorrow Man, Lillith, the Demon Princess and others.

She still holds onto her faith in God and in God's goodness— she claims that her first word as a baby was "Jesus", though she may have been joking. Disillusioned however, her faith is frail and it shows in her pessimistic attitude. Judging from her name, which means "of the cross," she may be French. Sister Shannon does not remember her from their childhood days at the academy, but despite their differences, she gets along well enough with her cafeteria catholic rival.

Toya Turner portrays Mary in the Netflix series adaptation.

Lillith the Demon Princess
Lillith, the Demon Princess, represents the kinder, gentler side of Hell. From her, we learn that there are many competing demon factions and not all obey the Devil. Confirming that Satan cannot stand against Satan lest his kingdom fall, there have been various fratricidal civil wars in which even "the accursed devils" fight Satan out of their own self-interest. In fact, when Julius Salvius planned to free the Devil from his dungeon in the lowest pits of Hell, Lillith's leader Orcus sent her to Earth—or the Prime Material Plane as demons call it—to keep this from happening. The logic was that if the Satan were to be freed, then he would rally the damned by charisma or force and lead them all in a fight against God, a fight that Orcus knows cannot be won. After that battle, she was temporarily powerless and trapped on Earth without her wings before returning to the underworld.

Sylvia De Fanti portrays Mother Superion in the Netflix series adaptation.

Father Goth
Perhaps the Vatican's most powerful Magic Priest, Father Goth is a force to be reckoned with. In his younger days, he was a children's teacher at the Saint Thomas Academy where he taught the boys campus, just as young Mother Superion (then Sister Katherine) taught the girls. He would wear a cassock and a slouch hat.  Among his students was the future Father David Crowe.  He ultimately left teaching to become an active duty Magic Priest but never lost his touch.  When Jason was shown to have superhuman powers, he sheltered the boy and recommended him for Silver Cross.

Grim and taciturn, he grew grimmer (and got scars and cybernetic eye) when he returned after being thought dead when, in the "Masada Incident" of 1989, he disappeared fighting a "type 7 demon in the vortex."  He returned to Earth to battle the same demon, Gorath.  He and his fellow warrior won and he showed that, despite his grim attitude, he will smile now and again after having "saved the day."

In addition to flight, mind control, and other  standard powers, he can cross dimensions, and wields a crozier called the Staff of Enoch. He uses it as a Quarterstaff or a Bō and can also use it to fire energy bolts.  It is capable of various other effects and is dangerous to those not fit to touch it.  Idolized by his fellow clerics and other religious, he is never seen without his jet black Greatcoat mixing metal studs and leather straps with his clerical clothing, and his trademark slouch hat.

The Twelve Magic Priests
Founded one-hundred forty six years after the Warrior Nuns in about 1212, the Magic Priests are the second most famous of the Defensive Units and are the Catholic Corps preferred Unit. There are thirty six Magic Priests in the world with twelve of them on active duty, doubtless in imitation of the Twelve Apostles.

These Twelve are--

Father Goth—As noted as above, perhaps the Vatican's most powerful Magic Priest, Father Goth is a force to be reckoned with. In his younger days, he was a children's teacher at the Saint Thomas Academy where he taught the boys campus, just as young Mother Superion (then Sister Katherine) taught the girls. Among his students was the future Father Crowe. He would wear a cassock and a slouch hat. Grim and taciturn, he ultimately left teaching to become an active duty Magic Priest; he is regarded as one of the best. Nationality unknown.
Father David Crowe—As noted above, Crowe is the Magic Priest most often seen. He is one of the best and is seen to have romantic feelings for Sister Shannon. He is American.
Father Erasmus Stone—The man most often paired with Father Crowe, the two are friends. He is a large man with a mohawk and a cybernetic eye. He often hides his emotions behind a gruff exterior. Nationality unknown.
Father Fang—He has worked with Father Crowe. He is also an eccentric in that for unknown reasons, Father Fang's speech seems limited to phrases from the King James Bible, whether in casual conversation or the middle of a blazing combat situation. Nationality unknown but presumably English-speaking world.
Father Mark McKane—An American and one of Crowe's friends. He frequently wears a stole.
Father Lopez—He is an older man with gray hair, presumably Hispanic.
Father MacLeod—A Scotsman?
Father Webb—Nationality unknown.
Father Paine—A large hulking man with a cybernetic eye and various implants. He is seen to where a black body suit, or unitard in contrast to the uniforms of fellow clerics.
Father Kubiczek—A Pole?
Father Duvalier—A Frenchman?

Sister Frenzy
She is a European nun—seemingly non combat or "vocational"—who was nearly killed when a demon exploded her church. She was rescued by the famous Kotnick, a demon hunter and "nun collector." (He has a catchphrase, "Pax Vobiscum," Latin for "peace be with you.") However, her face was ruined and she has since worn a mask beneath her veil. He then became a surrogate father to her and trained her to be a Warrior Nun dubbed Frenzy. She is strong weightlifter, a skilled knife fighter, and a sniper, though in combatting demons she uses bullets made of frozen holy water.

Sister Helen
Wearing glasses, she is one of Sister Shannon's students. Like her teacher, she is assigned to St. Thomas Church but is somewhat overeager, going after enemies she could not expect to defeat. She is also not quite serious, playing with Sister Shannon's Sword of Antoich—and injuring herself in the process. For that she is disciplined.

Sister Christine
Sister Christine was assigned to St. Thomas Church on Mother Superion's orders while Sister Shannon's went to Japan. She stayed on afterwards for a short time before leaving. She is older and very skilled but she is can be quite unorthodox, dressing in chic fashion when off duty, disdaining her veil, and approaching combat with a sense of cheerful informality. She gave Jason his action figures. She is critical of Magic Priest's preferential treatment. She is also a good fighter, but impulsive and somewhat hidebound. (She does not believe in the legend of the original Sister Areala.)

Sister Madeline
Active since at least 1971, Sister Madeline is an older Warrior Nun who has seen better days. Either due to injuries or to compensate for her age, she has both an eyepatch and cybernetic arms that can turn into miniguns. She is nicknamed "Mad Lynn" for her fierce fighting style. At the moment she cares for the Silver Cross orphans and trains them for their future duties as soldiers of Christ. She is quite stern—more so that Sister Shannon ever was in raising Jason, or Mother Superion was in raising Sister Shannon—but does so thinking to discipline her charges. It seemingly proved useful when they and their drill sergeant proved a team to be reckoned with when they fought Madeline's old foe Dr. Frederick Ottoman. However, while she suffers the children come to her and as much as she might care for children in the abstract, she has a hard time conveying actual affection.

Children of Silver Cross
Tracing its origins back to 1212 when participants of the failed Children's Crusade were rescued from slavery, one of them being given a silver cross, Silver Cross trains future Magic Priests and Warrior Nuns. The Silver Cross program has survived into modern times with the current crop of future Magic Priests and Warrior Nuns cared for by Sister Madeline. They are mostly preadolescents. While some children are from Catholic countries such as France and Brazil, other come from traditionally anti-Catholic countries such as England, or even from Egypt which would imply belonging Eastern Catholicism such as the Coptic Catholic Church.

They include -

David "Mark" Montoya - Very brash, the young Brazilian has the power to control the velocity of moving objects.
David Young - The youngest student, ten years old, and hailing from England, he specializes in electrical manipulation.
Allison Powers - She is a skilled staff expert and hails from France.
John Blessing - A stereotypical "ugly American", he has the power of controlling inertia. He mostly manifests this as a form of super-strength
Diana Saladin - Hailing from Egypt, Diana is a skilled swordswoman and hopes to become a Warrior Nun. She is also a great admirer of Sister Shannon and will pray the rosary, for her success in battle. For her part, Sister Shannon has taken the girl under her wing.
Jessica Keller - Though blind, Jessica Keller wielded a vast assortment of telepathic, and telekinetic powers and was ironically the most powerful of the Silver Cross children. Silent, passive, and pious, she was the most mature of her fellow students and was their unofficial leader. Sister Madeline saw her abilities and thought to break with tradition by recommending her for the Magic Priest program; this request was denied. Though she has since died in combat, she was last seen in Heaven with blindness replaced by sight and being shown about by Stephen of Burgess.
Jason - An amnesiac with no memory of his past, he was raised by Sister Shannon until he found himself with extraordinary power upon which he joined Silver Cross. He enjoys his position but tries to stay in touch with Sister Shannon. He was not one of the original Silver Cross children. For more information please see his article above.

The Papacy
As might be expected, the papacy plays a role in the Warrior Nun Areala. With how the papacy goes back for centuries, flashbacks often mention popes of past times and places. Often mentioned and sometimes seen, occupants of the fictional papacy are often fictionalized versions of the real ones. Three popes thus far have starred as major characters.

Pope John Paul I

John Paul I was a minor character, principally appearing in flashbacks to the time of his pontificate; there, he was quite differently from how he was in real life. While the real John Paul I has been called "an intellectual lightweight" he is portrayed in the comic book as a strong, decisive man dedicated to rooting out a conspiracy of Freemasons within the Vatican. They kill him by conspiracy though the killers are ultimately apprehended and his death avenged.

Pope John Paul II

Pope John Paul II was a minor character in the series before his death. He would be referenced periodically by various people as "the Pope" and documents displaying his personal coat of arms—see here—do show that Sister Shannon's early adventures indeed happened during his pontificate. She even met him once at the climax of Warrior Nun Areala/Scorpio Rose #4, though with his death she presumably proceeded to serve under Pope Benedict XVI and then Pope Francis.

Pope Ignatus
In one story-arc, Warrior Nun Areala Vol 3. #11-12, we see a single immortal pontiff, "Pope Ignatus." A vain and somewhat self-centered individual, Ignatus is literally a child and has remained physically a child through all the millennia he has reigned as the Church's immortal pope since the beginning of the institution. He is, in fact, thought by the world at large to in fact be the history's only Pope. Ignatus encourages this thought though at one point he tells Cardinal Stark the story of how "a man from Galilee", founded the Church on a wandering Holy Man whom He dubbed Pius. The Galilean charged Pius with going away to build a palace to house God's Earthly representative. Pius, the first Pope, did so and after finding Ignatus raised the boy as his son and raised him to the task. Ignatus has led the Church to this day.

Though later stories confirm that at least some aspects of the storyarc are true such as the Vatican suffering a great attack, Ignatus existence directly contradicts many earlier stories which feature or mention many real world Popes to the point that those stories are rendered untenable. Also, Ignatus' very existence was implicitly retconned since then.

Villains

Satan

Satan is the source of all evil. Also known as Lucifer, the Devil, the Evil One, the Father of Lies, the Father of Misery, the Source of All our Woes, the Sower of Discord, the King of Hell, the Arch-Fiend, the Enemy, he is the chief villain and behind-the-scenes mastermind of all evil in the Warrior Nun Areala universe.

He, as Lucifer, was created by God to be one of the finest of angels but he was filled with pride, and ultimately rebelled against his Creator. Thinking that he could rule better than his Omniscient Creator, he led other angels in revolt but they were cast out from Heaven. Since then, Lucifer, now "Satan" or "Enemy [of God]"  has waged a ceaseless war against God, part of that war being leading His children on the path of damnation. Seeking nothing short of the destruction of all goodness and the enslavement of all creation, his war potentially stretches across the universe.

Standing in his way has been the Christian faith. Prior to Christ's sacrifice and resurrection and the subsequent spreading of the Good News, Satan had been free to deal with the gentiles with how God's favor was on just one Chosen People. Afterwards, he was in a quandary with how the Christian faith was leading billions of souls to the worship of God and the Salvation He freely offered. The Church soon became a bulwark against Satan's schemes spreading this faith and providing defense against physical assault in the figure of the Areala—whom God Himself had named and sanctioned—and her Warrior Nuns and the Magic Priests. The Vatican has since become the first line of defense for Earth and the primary means by which Heaven wages a proxy war against Hell.

At the moment, he is confined in the fiery blazes of Hell ruling over the demons and the damned, though he can project his image and voice outward. Satan's Earth bound minions, be they human devil worshippers or demons themselves, have tried to free their dark lord from his imprisonment though all have failed. As such, he tends to work through human channels using deceit and treachery to beguile humans and let them do the "dirty work." The most significant example of these was Germany's National Socialists, or Nazis.

It is worth noting that there is a great variety of demons and not all obey Satan; indeed, most do not. Even in the Bible there are reports of demons so terrified of Satan that they begged Jesus to not exorcise them and send them to Hell, and of Jesus warning His followers to not take pleasure in forcing demons to submit to them. An important breakaway sect is led by Orcus; he and his followers do not submit to Satan. Realizing from experience that fighting God is futile and suicidal, Orcus prefers a policy of coexistence. He and his followers, most notably Lillith, have been known to protect innocent life.

The Beast

The Beast, or Anti-Christ, has appeared as a villain in the series. His first appearance was as a naked man named Az Rabah wandering the deserts of Libya wherein he amerged from the sea and spoke in quasi-Koranic verse saying he was sent by one who need only say "Be, and it is". His right-hand man was named Hafidh Aziz; Aziz is presumably the False Prophet. In a not very subtle jab, it shows an almost medieval view of Islam with the Middle East Muslim world as the Anti-Christ's base of operations and Muslim armies flocking to serve him. He is not portrayed as Islam's arch-deceiver the Dajjal who rejects Islam and will try to lead people away from it. Rather Az Rabah goes to Mecca (something said to be impossible for the Dajjal) and gives anti-western speeches at the Kaaba where he is hailed as the prophesied redeemer of Islam, or Mahdi, who will lead people towards Islam. Hafidh Aziz—whose first name is a variant of Hafiz or someone who has memorized the Koran—the False Prophet then leads the people in virtual worship of him. Fueled by Radical Islam, nearly all the Arab World joined the Mahdi/Anti-Christ's coalition of nations in a bid for world domination.

As the Beast, Rabah claims to wield the powers of "the greatest of all the angels," that is to say Satan, and claims to be a Nephilim, or hybrid of woman and Grigori a kind of fallen angel. Seeming to prove that he wields a vast assortment of abilities and easily overpowered a company of Magic Priests sent against him. Sister Shannon managed to defeat him, thus postponing his inevitable rise to power and inevitable casting into the Lake of Fire. While he was ultimately beaten and his Muslim armies dispersed, the Anti-Christ has since taken residence in the United States as an evil American politician named Senator White.

The Nazis

National Socialism, or Nazism for short, was a German political movement begun in 1919 and that quickly became identified with Adolf Hitler, a German corporal originally sent to spy on the organization by German intelligence but who ultimately became its leader. Hitler and his "Nazis" quickly rose to power; this was due in part to Hitler's promises of revenge against the Allies for the Versailles Treaty which humiliated a defeated Germany in World War I, his scapegoating of Jews, Gypsies, Slavs, and other Untermenschen for said defeat, by providing jobs for unemployed Germans amidst the Great Depression, and appealing to German racial pride. In the decades since its fall Nazism has come to be seen as synonymous with evil; it is fact that, in real life, Nazism did have some occult undercurrents though this was of overall minor importance.

However, the fictional Nazis of Warrior Nun Areala, like fictional Nazis elsewhere, are portrayed as sadistic, robotic monsters. Also, like other popular culture portrayals of the man, the fictionalized  Hitler is shown as an evil genius who is not only Satan's right hand but who seeks world domination. However, in that that Hitler was used according to Nazism's role as pop culture stock villains and not as a deliberate character (like Marvel Comics’s Hate-Monger), portrayals vary according to the writer. He might be portrayed as out-of control, hyperagressive sociopath who leads attacks from the front. He might be portrayed as a superstitious coward undeserving of his reputation. He might be portrayed as a cold, pitiless monster who holds everyone and everything around him in contempt. He (as seen after being briefly resurrected) might be portrayed as an egotistical buffoon who boasts of being a greater villain than Saddam Hussein, Muammar al-Gaddafi or anyone else. Regardless of the man's myriad interpretations, Satan saw in Hitler a man after his own heart and invested his full power and support in the Nazi cause. In the mid-1930s, the original Sister Areala and her fellow Arealas watched this from Heaven and were worried that through Hitler, Satan's influence on Earth would be greater than it ever had been previous.

The apostate-Catholic, anti-Christian, and pagan Hitler rose to infamy as the most evil man that ever lived as he and his followers wrought on the Earth its darkest hour. They practiced black magic, recruited fallen angels such Azazel, and sought to claim various Christian relics to pervert their powers to their unholy cause. However, while the fictional Hitler is portrayed as willing to deal with the supernatural, he would delegate most of his responsibilities in this to Nazi mystic Reichsführer-SS Heinrich Himmler. The Nazis were also aided by villains like Morgan Le Fay, King Arthur's sister survived into modern day who allied with them in hopes of destroying her brother's kingdom, England, and Mordecai Black, former Catholic priest gone renegade who hoped to destroy the Church. Professing white supremacy and genocide, the Nazis served Satan well as they wrought forth death, suffering, and Hell on Earth. In fact, terms of raw results, regardless of the final outcome, the Nazis were the most successful pawns Satan ever had. Even now, Satan has not forgotten their service; footsoldiers of his current right hand, Julian Salvius would wear the brown shirt uniforms of Nazi Stormtroopers complete with Nazi armband though with a pentagram used in place of the Swastika.

However, like in real life, the Nazis ultimately destroyed themselves with how Hitler was a man too close to Satan's heart. Too stubborn and megalomaniacal to ever admit defeat or that he was wrong, Hitler marched himself and Germany towards mutual annihilation by all the combined forces of the Allies. Though officially neutral as in the real world, the Vatican was also a major player sending its Catholic Corps forces to face down the Nazis supernatural threats. It presumably also condemned the Nazis and saved what lives it could from the Nazi genocide as it did in the real world. It ended with their leaders imprisoned, their cities in ruins, their country torn in two, and their Führer dead by suicide on Walpurgis Night. Unwilling to admit defeat, some Nazis chose to escape and they or their descendants have since waged terrorist/guerrilla campaigns becoming Neo-Nazis that still pose a threat to the peace and stability of the world. A good example is Colonel Ottoman taking his Wunderwaffen to Imperial Japan in January 1945. On seeing that Hitler's cause was doomed, Ottoman hid his wonder-weapons away so that they could be used at a later date by those wishing to continue the cause. The one to do so was his grandson, Frederick Ottoman.

The current world spanning Fourth Reich is Ottoman's Teutonic Knights and hides behind the front of the Ottoman Corporation

Dr. Frederick Ottoman and the Teutonic Knights
Evil genius/mad scientist and Nazi mystic Dr. Frederick Ottoman is the leader of the Teutonic Knights a Neo-Nazi group that seeks to establish a Fourth Reich.

Ottoman's Nazi roots run deep. His grandfather was a devoted Nazi and a Colonel in either the Wehrmacht or perhaps even the SS who on seeing the Third Reich was doomed, died towards the end of the war in an attempt to lay down the groundwork for a fourth Reich. It has been stated by creator Ben Dunn that the Ottoman family is not necessarily German and that is seen with Frederick Ottoman's father—and presumably the Colonel's son—Selim Ottoman was a subject of the German allied Ottoman Empire, hence the family name, and his mother was Anna Lumsden a German woman. Both died in the Dresden bombing. Ottoman later served fanatically as a twelve-year-old child soldier in the Hitler Youth in the last days of the war. He met Hitler and fought the Red Army in the Battle of Berlin where he lost his right eye. He survived and has since grown up—and still looking some thirty years old or less to once again try to enslave the Earth for the Master Race.

Seeing humanity as fundamentally corrupt, Ottoman's ultimate goal is to destroy the village/world in order to save it. He dreams of creating a New World Order in which Christianity will be abolished and worship of Adolf Hitler who in Ottoman's mind is the true Messiah will be law. That is because, like Hitler, he believes that Christianity must be destroyed and a new civilization must be built on the ashes of the old in which the swastika will be the "true" sign of the cross. (He has somehow even managed to steal fragments of Hitler's skull from Russian archives for use in worship.) Indeed, while he enjoys being the villain, Ottoman sincerely believes that he fighting for a greater good and imagines himself a cultured, civilized man with good taste in music. Like the first Nazis, he does not understand why any reasonable person would oppose him. Why is he not just trying to foil the Jewish-Communist conspiracy?

This is quite the opposite of how demons pursue their goals of genocide and hate against all that lives for the sake of pleasure and to spite God whose children they harm. Seeing in them a common enemy he has even fought against them. Thus, despite Satanic involvement in Nazism in Warrior Nun Areala, he is wary of demons who wish to destroy the Earth whilst he "merely" wishes to enslave it.

Due to his wealth from his Ottoman Corporation serving as a front for these goals, he has the money to fund his plans. He has various bases around the world such as in South America where he engaged in Mengele like experiments on children to find a "God gene," or a way to naturalistically understand the Magic Priests' faith based powers. He has Nazi agents around the world infiltrating various governments and his chief base is somewhere in the Appalachian Mountains with a fleet of Nazi UFOs. At his side are various Nazi friendly Muslim Anti-Semites. He is known and is tracked by world governments; in one assault on his South American base in the 1970s, Sister Madeline teamed up with the Israeli Mossad against him.

Ottoman was seen to have a knowledge of the occult and was a genius in bioengineering, so much so that oni such as Lord Akuma, being magical beings and having limited understanding of science, sought his aid. However, Akuma betrayed and seemingly killed him. His body was then respectfully taken away by one of his Karl furry dog-men creations. (These things may or may not be reference to the Werwolf plan for a post war Nazi resistance movement.) He later returned and attempted to subvert the children of Silver Cross and launch the "Hate Wave" and other plans since then.

Four Horsemen of the Apocalypse

The Four Horsemen make appearances, following popular interpretations as being War, Famine, Pestilence and Death. They are literal horsemen and have the powers their names imply. They are led by Death. They appear as extremely mercenary working for various masters. As part of this, they will often dress according to the time and place.

Beelzebub

Beelzebub, the "prince of demons," makes a few appearances, chiefly in a "flashforward" at least two centuries into the future as the victorious emperor of a "hell planet" having crushed all human opposition. He is shown having successfully evaded detection by the (future) Vatican's space forces.

Orcus

Likely the true Orcus of Roman myth, he is a demon warlord and Lillith's former employer. He is one of the less evil demons and opposes Satan for fear that Satan would restart active war against Heaven. Having fought in the War of Heaven, he knows the futility of fighting God. In fact, when Julius Salvius sought to free Satan, Orcus sent Lillith to prevent that from happening. This goodwill ended soon after when he betrayed her in order to take Lillith's lands and power in the hopes of perhaps even being able to challenge Satan for the infernal throne. He may also have framed Lillith for murder out of the knowledge that her mother, Hexa, would ask to be punished in her place. The price of that was that Lillith would have to serve him. It is known that his son Utak killed Lillith's angelic father.

Also, if his earliest appearances in Dunn's Ninja High School are considered canonical relative to his appearances in Areala, he also owns Hell's portion of the McDonald's franchise. Like McDonald's elsewhere—such as India serving beefless Maharaja Macs, Israel's cheeseless kosher BigMacs, or the Philippines' McSpaghetti—Hell's McDonald's feature culture specific food such as McTorment shakes. Orcus is known for using his position as owner of Hell's portion of the franchise to demote failed minions to work flipping burgers at "McJobs."

Asmodeus

Asmodeus makes a few appearances. His chief appearance was in a flashback to 1939 when he appeared to the Jewish anti-hero Hammer to lure him away from his duties so that Hammer would not be there to prevent the Holocaust. He succeeded; although Hammer did ultimately win the fight against him, when he returned to the human world years later, it was late 1945 outside of Auschwitz.

Helga/Nebelhexa
Helga was the Captain of the Valkyrie, Odin's woman warriors. She trained Auria, the future Areala, to be a Valkyrie and enjoyed "hazing" her pupil. However, after Auria bested her in combat, even before gaining a Valkyrie's strength, she nursed a grudge against her. This grew after Auria fell in love with Tyr, whom Helga wanted for herself. It climaxed when Auria/Areala renounced Odin and Areala humiliated Helga in battle before her warriors, leaving her a scarred and bloodied face. She swore revenge and has tried to keep that vow. Even as Areala has her avatar, so does Helga, the Nebelhexa or Nebelhexe, though unlike Areala she will choose men as well as women.

In the 18th century, Helga formed the Sorority of Evil, a group of devil worshiping witches. Today, they operate behind the front of a big business, Black Metal Multi Media and are led by Nebelhexa. Over the centuries, Warrior Nuns Areala and the Nebelhexas have done battle as cowgirls in the Wild West, swordsmen in the Three Musketeer's France, as a Christian knight and a quasi-Muslim jihadist in the Crusades, and presumably many others. The first was one of the Vikings that tried to rape the original Sister Areala. She turned the lone survivor into an evil wizard who transferred his soul into a golem with the sole task of killing Arealas and it went about doing it sometimes successfully, sometimes not for over a thousand years until it was permanently destroyed by Sister Shannon.

Helga, the sole forgotten survivor of Ragnarök, has thus vicariously clashed with her old enemy time and again but she has lost time and again because, in Areala's words "... NONE may withstand the power of God!" That is seen with how Helga once killed a Nebelhexa by overloading her with power in hopes of killing (the original) Areala's Sister Shannon. She died after Shannon said "My power comes from the Almighty! And His is a power you cannot equal!"

In German, Nebelhexe means "fog witch."

Demon Foster
Unlike his rival, Lillith, Demon Foster is a loyal follower of Satan and sworn enemy of God. He first appeared in the service of Julius Salvius and led Salvius troops in an attempt to destroy the Vatican and later New York City. While thought killed by Lillith, he later returned as the Red Mask/Masque, a double agent who on the surface worked for Nazi Frederick Ottoman. Seeking to forge alliances with Japan's Oni, he and Mr Kailanx worked with Lord Akuma of the Teutonic Knights and of a possible alliance to use and then dispose of the still human Frederick Ottoman. While Foster and Akuma did unite and they did manage to betray Ottoman and use his technology in an attempt at world destruction, that too failed with the Onis' power broken. Though again thought dead, he survived that encounter and was upgraded into a monstrous cyborg by Satan's Mengele, Mr. Kailanx a human looking mad scientist demon.

While primarily hailing from the fallen angels who defied the Lord, Foster is seen to be friendly towards the monsters and evil spirits of other belief systems and hopes for the unity of all demons.

Demon Foster is shown to have a variety of powers at his disposal, among them the power to grow spider legs from his body for use as weapons.

Mr. Kailanx
Mr. Kailanx is Satan's Mengele, a human looking mad scientist demon. Allied with Demon Foster, he has worked with him on various ventures, first in aiding his ventures as Red Mask and later in repairing him after his presumed death. Kailanx masquerades as an innocuous gray-haired old man wearing suit and bow tie. He will infiltrate human organizations to gain technology he otherwise would not have, most notably Delta Corps which was riddled by demon moles from the very first issue of the very first series. A sadist, his Hell laboratory is analogous to Imperial Japan's Unit 731 or the Nazi labs with the exception that the damned cannot be put out of their misery and suffer indefinitely. He will also strike out on his own, hatching his own plots. He is also seen to jealously guard his lab, sometimes abandoning his latest plot to protect his lab.

Julian Salvius
Also called Julius Salvius or Salvius Julianus, he was Sister Shannon's first foe. From his name, and from his remarks about being a Roman Emperor and of having been "cursed by the Christians" he seems to be Julian the Apostate survived into modern times. In addition to being the last pagan Roman Emperor in an Empire that had already converted to Christianity, the real Julian renounced the faith into which he had been baptized (the faith his uncle Emperor Constantine had legalized and embraced) and tried to revive paganism. If Julius Salvius is in fact is Julian the Apostate, it is not said where he was from his "death" in 363 to the modern day. However, has evidently clashed with the Church for some time as senior members of the Catholic Corps will use him like a boogeyman to keep younger members of the Catholic Corps in line.

In modern times, he led a double life was a wealthy industrialist/arms dealer and a Satanist. Furthering the Nazi demon connection, he would have "brown shirts" in his employ though the swastika was replaced with a pentagram. More than just a pagan and an anti-Christian, he is now an evil wizard and servant of the Devil who sought to free the Devil from the pits of Hell and destroy the Catholic Church to take revenge against the Christians who cursed him. His plan was thwarted and he was thought killed. He was in fact imprisoned in the Vatican and later managed to escape seeking revenge against Sister Shannon and the rest of the Catholic Church.

In the Netflix series adaptation, the character is re-imagined as a woman named Jillian Salvius, portrayed by Thekla Reuten.

The Hammer
The Hammer is an embittered Jewish anti-hero who opposes Catholicism.

Today a citizen of Israel and a grandfather, his true name is Zev Schlieffer and he was born in the town of Oświęcim to a Polish Rabbi. He was empowered by his father in the Kabbalah for the purpose of preventing the Holocaust which he foresaw. Young Hammer, however, ignored his father and, prior to World War II, he left to battle the demon Asmodeus regardless of his father's warnings. He returned to the human world and his home of Oświęcim just after World War II finding himself in front of Auschwitz concentration camp. Auschwitz is German for Oświęcim.

Despite having forsworn his duty and being responsible for the genocide (and the death of his father who died in transit to Dachau in 1942) he could have prevented, he scapegoats the Catholic Church. He sees the entire hierarchy as guilty for involvement in the ratlines, the smuggling of war criminals out of Germany by two priests. In seeking access to the Vatican Secret Archives for material on the subject, he was prepared to kill anyone—and he hospitalized several—to do so though he promised to "mourn" his victims. He was stopped by Cardinal Stark who talked him out of it.

Aside from that, he has been seen defending Israel from attack and has brought ex-Nazis to justice as a Nazi hunter. He must have the staff given him by his father to use his powers. He is also anti-American. He sees the United States as weak and materialist.

The Holy Man
The Holy Man is perhaps a slight spoof on real life atheists in that he does not believe because he does not want to believe. This is seen with how angels and demons are in plain sight for the world to see, one letter to the editor of Warrior Nun Areala stated that people would have no choice but to believe.

The Holy Man, however claims to not just be an atheist but an "anti-theist" in that he sees all religion as a fraud and that it must be destroyed for humans to evolve. And he plans to destroy it by any means necessary such as by murdering people of faith and destroying any house of worship. A manic and seemingly insane Joker like character, his madness seems to stem from the fact that he refuses to accept God's existence but can not logically do so with the supernatural right in front of him. This extends to his stalking Sister Shannon and wanting to kill her for being living proof of what he refuses to believe in.

This leads to near-madness. His schizophrenia and self-contradictory attitude is seen in that he claims not to have a soul thereby acknowledging that souls exist, and thereby God the maker of souls. He then adds that not having a soul is what makes him realise that religion is false. He sees his belief in the non-existence of God as a license for immoral behavior on the logic that if there is no God dictating morality, then there are no moral absolutes, no fear of damnation, no reason to be good, only a concern for self because if there is no God there can be no morality as humans are then nothing made by nothing from nothing and for nothing and are no more intrinsically important than any other form of dead matter and that attempts to believe otherwise are mere self delusions since despite such attempts at philosophy and ethics for its own sake there is in the end still nothing more than an empty godless world. Thus, in Holy Man's view, human beings should accept that they are a freak accident arising from said indifferent universe and that their lives are unworthy of life.

He was created by Barry Lyga as part of an attempt to make a serious Areala, one that viewed the subject matter from an intellectual point of view and not mere tongue in cheek gimmickery. In fact, it had been Lyga's hope to make Holy Man the primary villain of his Areala series had it progressed beyond six issues. (Holy Man's last appearance in fact ended with a sinister hidden camera at the Saint Thomas Church recording Sister Shannon's actions.) The fact that Lyga mentioned attacks on synagogues and mosques perhaps means that had the story continued, the view of various religions in the world of Areala would have continued. Unfortunately for Lyga, the audience for the book liked the more tongue-in-cheek approach of other Areala authors and he left; thus, despite occasional glimpses like him being used as a holographic training program, Holy Man has never been seen again.

It may be asked if he has no god, from where does the atheist Holy Man have his power. Though Lyga never managed to address that it can be assumed that in the larger context of the Areala universe, it is due to the "God-gene," a genetic mutation that allows humans to tap into supernatural powers, perhaps with or without the individual invoking his or her god. It was something first hypothesized by the anti-Christian Nazi Frederick Ottoman perhaps out of his refusal to accept God. It was later expounded on by Anti-Christ Az Rabah as a remnant of angels taking human wives and imparting power in their children. Lending credence to this, Holy Swords have little effect on Holy Man.

Mordecai Black
Mordecai Black is an apostate Catholic and evil atheist that has since rejected the Church. When asked by others how he can explain the supernatural and the existence of angels and demons, he often dodges the question.

Having turned away from the faith in the 1930s his stories mostly appear in flashbacks. Black had originally been one of the Magic Priests until he came to believe that there was no God and with that decided to destroy the Church. His first act as an atheist was to sabotage a Magic Priest gathering and kill them all with a bomb. This would later prove a boon to the Nazis with how the generation of Magic Priests that could have and would have faced them down was killed. He later aided Hitler in trying to enlist the fallen angel Azazal to his aid. However, touching Azazal's tomb somehow broke Black's mind and spirit. He has since lived as a lonely, miserable hermit at the foot of the tomb into the modern day. He expresses some remorse for his actions however and has vowed to guard the tomb.

Lord Akuma
A Japanese Oni who sought world domination, Akuma was freed from underneath his prison under Hiroshima when it was destroyed in 1945. He worked for years undermining Japan's spirituality until he teamed with Dr. Frederick Ottoman for the purpose of creating an army of monsters. After Ottoman served his purposes, he was (seemingly) killed and Akuma took his technologies for himself and stole necessary relics from the Ise Shrine. He was on the verge of freeing his fellow oni from their prisons beneath Japan when he was defeated by Sister Shannon's grandfather, the onmiyoji Ota Yoma.

His followers have since scattered across Japan.

Masons

In real life, the real Masons are—allegedly—merely a fraternal organization with, no more noteworthy than any other club. However, due to its perceived secretive nature, Freemasonry has long been a subject of conspiracy theories in which Freemasonry is portrayed as bent on world domination or as being secretly in control of world politics. Not only that, but there has traditionally been religious opposition to it from the Catholic Church on grounds that Catholic Theism is incompatible with Masonic Deism.

The fictional Masons seen in Warrior Nun Areala embody the worst traits of all these things. The fictional Masons are led by the immortal and undead Sixtus VI who proclaimed himself anti-pope in 1696 in opposition to Innocent XII and are part of millennia long Illuminati/New World Order out to gain world domination.

They have various moles in world governments and in the hierarchy of the Church. They get recruits  by promising eternal earthly life, albeit as a putrifying corpses. (Concerning that they admit that there are some drawbacks.) The Masons also have various demons at their command and engage in the worship of gods or monsters called the Primordials. Being that they seem to exist outside of time, the Cthulhu like Primordials wield enormous power. It is not known what the Primordials are, possibly GAOTU, or when Masonry began; it is known that they have existed for centuries, perhaps even millennia and will exist for centuries at least to come.

The Masons ultimate centuries-long goal was to destroy the Catholic Church from the inside and gradually replace it with the worship of their own gods. To that end Sixtus VI took human form and infiltrated the Apostolic Palace as part of Pope John Paul II's Papal Household. The Masons plot has since been foiled.

References

Lists of comics characters